Mass City (also known as Mass) is an unincorporated community in Ontonagon County in the U.S. state of Michigan. Mass City has its own post office with the 49948 ZIP Code .

History
Mass City was first settled in 1848 by Noel Johnson, an escaped slave from Missouri who discovered copper in the area; Johnson later sold the copper deposits to the Mass Mining Company. Mass City was formally organized in 1855 and named for the mass copper mined in the area. The original site of Mass City was abandoned in 1899, when Abram and Nellie Mathews platted the current site. A post office opened in Mass City on June 15, 1899; Christ P. Anderson was the first postmaster.

Geography 
The small town is located within Ontonagon County, the Greenland Township in the foothills of the Porcupine Mountains. It is home to an abundance of natural forestry and wildlife able to be explored via the Courtney Lake/Old Grade Ski Trail which runs through parts of the Ottawa National Forest.

Demographics

References

Census-designated places in Ontonagon County, Michigan
Census-designated places in Michigan
Unincorporated communities in Ontonagon County, Michigan
Unincorporated communities in Michigan
Populated places established in 1848
1848 establishments in Michigan